Pet in TV, known in Japan as , is a pet-raising simulation developed by MuuMuu Co. Limited and published by Sony Computer Entertainment. The game was released in Japan in May 1997, and later in Europe in August 1998. Pet in TV consists of teaching a virtual pet known as a PiT (Pet in TV) tricks, getting it new costumes and learning it what items are edible in the wild along with solving random puzzles around the PiT world.

Pet in TV on release gained very bad reviews for its lack of gameplay, storyline and lasting appeal. It was re-released on the Japanese PlayStation Network for PlayStation 3 and PlayStation Portable on February 22, 2007. The game and its Japan-exclusive sequel, Pet in TV with my dear Dog, were developed by the same team responsible for the Jumping Flash! series.

Gameplay
The player can choose from a selection of PiTs and name it. It is then up to the player to nurture their PiT and allow it to explore the 3D world, learning from its encounters with scenery and objects through trial-and-error. Once these behaviours are learned, the PiT will know how to respond to those objects in the future (such as a Flower, or a Spike). Whenever the PiT becomes injured, or tired, returning it to its home will allow Dr. Y to fix it.

The objective then becomes for the player's PiT to solve puzzles on its own - for which it will be rewarded with AI upgrade chips.

Reception

PlayStation Power gave the game a rating of 59%, and said it was "dull for adults" and "a bit bland".

References

1997 video games
PlayStation (console) games
PlayStation (console)-only games
Sony Interactive Entertainment games
Video games about robots
Video games developed in Japan
Virtual pet video games